La influencia is a 2007 Spanish drama film directed by Pedro Aguilera in his directorial debut. The film stars Casilda Aguilera, Claudia Bertorelli, Jimena Jiménez and Romeo Manzanedo in the lead roles. It was also premiered at the Fortnight sidebar of the Cannes Film Festival. It was initially supposed to be released on 24 May 2007 but was postponed for its theatrical release on 20 July 2007 and received mixed reviews.

Synopsis 
A disoriented and vulnerable woman overburdened with daily life problems and more her belongings are impounded, her cosmetics shop has been closed down and her children's future is unknown.

Cast 

 Casilda Aguilera
 Claudia Bertorelli
 Jimena Jiménez
 Romeo Manzanedo
 Álvaro Moltó
 Paloma Morales
 Gustavo Prins

References

External links 
 
 
 

2000s Spanish-language films
Spanish drama films
2007 directorial debut films
2007 films
2007 drama films
2000s Spanish films